Ceylon Democratic Unity Alliance is a political party based amongst plantation Tamils in Sri Lanka. The party was founded ahead of the 2002 municipal elections. Then the party got around 13 500 votes.

In the 2004 general elections the party polled 10,736 votes (0.12% of the nationwide vote).

The party is led by T.V. Chennan.

2002 establishments in Sri Lanka
Political parties established in 2002
Political parties in Sri Lanka
Tamil political parties in Sri Lanka